Wavrechain may refer to two communes in the Nord department in northern France:
 Wavrechain-sous-Denain
 Wavrechain-sous-Faulx